The Finger Lakes Railway  is a Class III railroad in the Finger Lakes region of New York. The company began operations on July 23, 1995, and operates in Onondaga, Cayuga, Seneca, Ontario, Schuyler and Yates counties. Between 2001 and 2013, the railroad operated a heritage railroad known as the Finger Lakes Scenic Railway which offered passenger train excursions.

Routes

Main line
FGLK main route runs from Syracuse to Canandaigua, New York over a distance of 76 miles. Once part of the New York Central Railroad and known as the Auburn Road, it dates all the way back to the Auburn and Syracuse Railroad.

At Syracuse, New York the FGLK interchanges with CSX Transportation and the New York, Susquehanna and Western Railway (NYSW).  Travelling west, the line passes through Solvay, Camillus, Skaneateles Junction (also known as Hartlot or Skaneateles Falls), Sennett, Auburn, Aurelius (Station name Relius), Cayuga, Seneca Falls and Waterloo.  At Geneva, New York, there is a connection with Norfolk Southern Railway's Corning Secondary.

Continuing west, the line passes through Phelps Junction and Clifton Springs.  In Shortsville, the railroad comes to the terminus of the Ontario Central Railroad.  Finally, the line arrives at Canandaigua, New York.

Branch line to Kendaia/Romulus
The FGLK operates a portion of the ex-Lehigh Valley Railroad mainline from Geneva to Kendaia, running south on the east side of Seneca Lake. This was the Lehigh Valley's mainline from Waverly, New York to Buffalo, New York. This line saw much action during World War II and the Cold War, with many military movements in and out of the Seneca Army Depot, until it closed in the summer of 1998. The now-closed base has a very large yard which at current time is used for rail car storage by the Finger Lakes Railway. The local industrial development agency works to attract new industries to locate at the abandoned depot because of the rail infrastructure.

Branch line from Penn Yan to Watkins Glen
The Penn Yan, New York branch was once part of the Pennsylvania Railroad. Only a small section of this line extends from Watkins Glen to Bellona.  To get to this line, the Finger Lakes Railway uses trackage rights over Norfolk Southern's Corning Secondary from Geneva to Himrod Junction, which is in the middle of the branch, from Penn Yan in the north to Watkins Glen, New York in the south.

Ontario Central
FGLK acquired the Ontario Central Railroad in October, 2007. Previously, the line had been owned by the Livonia, Avon and Lakeville Railroad. The two railroads connect near Shortsville, New York.

Midcoast Railservice
Starting August 1, 2022, Finger Lakes Railway subsidiary Midcoast Railservice operates the state-owned line between Brunswick, Maine and Rockland, Maine for three years.

History of Freight service 
The Finger Lakes Railway is predominantly a freight company. It was founded by three shortline railroad entrepreneurs, former Boston & Maine Railroad managers, Cynthia O’Connor and Michael Smith, and George Betke, Chairman of Farmrail with funding from Genesee & Wyoming. 

FGLR handles about 18,000 cars of freight each year. It handles a large variety of goods serving the local agricultural and manufacturing industries. The main cargo includes plastic, canned food, clay, grain, lumber and paper products, scrap steel, chemical substances, finished steel, salt, sand, soda ash, paper, potash, fertilizer, beer, phosphorus fertilizer, telephone poles and aluminum ingots. The Finger Lakes Railway interchanges with the Class I railroads CSX and Norfolk Southern, with connections to Canadian Pacific via Norfolk Southern.

Heritage railroad passenger excursion trains 
The FGLK once operated a passenger excursion service, The Finger Lakes Scenic Railway, as a heritage railroad.  Operations began in October, 2001 with four coaches having been purchased second-hand from Via Rail in late 1999. The cars arrived in the winter of 1999 after the seats were replaced.  Operation of the excursions ended in mid-2013.

When the excursions were being run, they included both general scenic and also seasonally-themed trips.

References

External links

Finger Lakes Railway (Official Website)

New York (state) railroads
Heritage railroads in New York (state)
Spin-offs of Conrail